{{safesubst:#invoke:RfD|||month = March
|day = 18
|year = 2023
|time = 06:14
|timestamp = 20230318061418

|content=
REDIRECT Thundercat (musician)

}}